Ashok Kumar Sarkar (7 October 1912 – 17 February 1983) was the editor-in-chief and owner of Anandabazar Patrika and ABP Group from 1958 to 1983 after death of Prafulla Kumar Sarkar the inaugural editor of Anandabazar Patrika.

Early life 
Ashok Kumar Sarkar was born in a Bengali Hindu family, the only child of Prafulla Kumar Sarkar and Nirjharini Sarkar. He was a graduate of the Scottish Church College. In 1957 he became an editor of the Desh magazine and a director of ABP Group. In 1958
upon the death of Prafulla Kumar Sarkar he became the second editor-in-chief of Anandabazar Patrika. He was among the first Indian journalists to start offset printing in newspapers. He organised an exhibition on Bengali printing in 1978 on the occasion of 200 yrs anniversary of the publication of first Bengali grammar by Nathaniel Brassey Halhed in 1778.

References

External links
 ″A Centenary Tribute - Ashok Kumar Sarkar (1912-1983)″, The Telegraph (Calcutta), 7 October 2012. Retrieved on 29 July 2017.

1912 births
1983 deaths
Journalists from West Bengal
Scottish Church College alumni
Indian magazine editors
Bengali people
Ashok Kumar
University of Calcutta alumni
ABP Group
Recipients of the Padma Bhushan in literature & education
20th-century Indian journalists
Indian male journalists